Puss Cuss Creek is a stream in Choctaw County, Alabama in the United States. It is a tributary of Okatuppa Creek.

The name Puss Cuss is derived from a Choctaw phrase meaning "child crying".

See also
List of rivers of Alabama

References

Rivers of Choctaw County, Alabama
Rivers of Alabama
Tributaries of the Tombigbee River
Alabama placenames of Native American origin